Igra Staklenih Perli (trans. The Glass Bead Game) was a Yugoslav progressive/psychedelic rock band formed in Belgrade in 1976.

The band was formed by keyboardist Zoran Lakić, guitarist Vojkan Rakić and percussionist Predrag Vuković and was later joined by bass guitarist and vocalist Draško Nikodijević and drummer Dejan Šoć. After the release of their debut self-titled album in 1978, Nikodijević was replaced by Slobodan Trbojević. The band released one more studio album, Vrt svetlosti, in 1980, before disbanding in 1985. In 2011 the band reunited for two concerts, after which Nikodijević and Vuković continued to perform with younger musicians under the name Igra Staklenih Perli The Next Generation.

History

1976-1985
The band was formed in 1976 by old school friends, Zoran Lakić "Švaba" (keyboards) Vojkan Rakić (guitar) and Predrag Vuković (percussion). They band was named after Hermann Hesse's book The Glass Bead Game and musically influenced by Can, early Pink Floyd, Hawkwind, Tangerine Dream and Jimi Hendrix. Until the arrival of the bass guitarist and vocalist Draško "Drak" Nikodijević, the band did not appear live.

Their first live appearances were at the amateur theatre festival Tokovi in Voždovac and in the Dadov Theatre. In autumn of 1977 they were joined by drummer Dragan Šoć. Having played numerous free concerts at Belgrade's Student's Cultural Center and in the open in Belgrade's Block 45, the band established a cult status and was offered a record contract by the PGP-RTB record label. In August 1978 they entered the studio and recorded their debut, self-titled album which featured the tracks "Gušterov trg" ("Lyzzard Square"), "Solarni modus" ("Solar Modus"), "Putovanje u plavo" ("Voyage into Blue"), "Pečurka" ("Mushroom") and "Majestetski kraj" ("Majestic End"). The album cover was designed by Vuković, who held a university degree in art history. The track "Pečurka" was recorded as a tribute to the band Can. In the interviews following the album release, the band described their music as "the music of the stream of consciousness". By then the group was appearing live with Goran Cvetić, a disk jockey and a journalist, who was in charge of the light show, slide shows and film projections during the performance. Their appearance at the Belgrade Faculty of Dental Medicine was bootlegged by Cvetić on a simple tape recorder for his personal archive.

Before  the recording of the second album, Draško Nikodijević left the band and was replaced by Slobodan Trbojević, who was at the time the bass guitarist for the jazz band Ptica (Bird) and Džuboks magazine journalist. The second album, entitled Vrt svetlosti (The Garden Of Light), was recorded from August 1979 until January 1980. The album was produced by Aleksandar Pilipenko. The album featured five tracks: "Igrač" ("Dancer"), "Čarobnjaci" ("Wizards"), "Vrt svetlosti" ("The Garden of Light"), "Lunarni Modus" ("Lunar Modus") and "Sanjaš" ("You Are Dreaming"). The album featured female vocalist Dragana Šarić, who would later start a successful solo carer under the name Bebi Dol. Cover art was designed by Vuković and designer Dejan Popov, but the first version of the cover was refused by PGP-RTB as "unprofessionally designed", although it was likely refused as overly psychedelic. The album was promoted at a fashion show in Beko hall in Belgrade. In 1982 director Stanko Crnobrnja make a short film about the band called Na svoj način (In Their Own Way). Their last public appearance was in 1985, in the Sava Center concert hall in Belgrade, on the celebration concert dedicated to the anniversary of the music magazine ITD. On this show the band performed with musician and music critics Aleksandar Žikić on guitar. Recordings for the third album with the working title ISP III were never officially released, but later appeared on the band's official MySpace.

During the 1970s and the 1980s many Belgrade musicians played with the band as guests. Out of the official members, the following took part: guitar players Goran Vejvoda, Ivan Pajević, Aleksandar Žikić and Bojan Kveder, keyboard player Zoran Zagorčić (from Električni Orgazam), and drummer Ivica Vdović Vd (from Šarlo Akrobata).

Post breakup
After Igra Staklenih Perli disbanded, Nikodijević formed White Rabbit Band, which featured Rakić on guitar. In the late 1980s Nikodijević moved to the United States, where he formed White Rabbit Cult with former Luna and Pekinška Patka guitarist Zoran "Bale" Bulatović. In 1999 White Rabbit Cult self-released the album ...And the Gods Made Wars, thematically inspired by the 1999 NATO bombing of Yugoslavia.

During the summer of 1991 German record label Kalemegdan Disk released three Igra Stalkenih Perli LPs. The first one, Soft Explosion Live, was Cvetić's recording of the concert at the Belgrade Faculty of Dental Medicine. In 1993, the album was remixed and re-released, with some of the tracks shortened and the track "Majestic End" replaced by "Soft Explosion". The next release was Inner Flow which featured unreleased material recorded in the 1976-1979 period. The third Kalemegdan Disk release was Drives, which featured recordings from a four hours session recorded in April 1977, backed with re-recordings made by Rakić, Vuković and keyboard player Zoran Zagorčić from the band Du Du A. Most of the artwork for these releases was designed by Vuković.

In 2005 Austrian record label Atlantide reissued both Igra Staklenih Perli and Vrt Svetlosti on vinyl. In 2007, remastered editions of both Igra Staklenih Perli studio albums appeared in Serbia and Germany. PGP-RTS label Retrologija (Retrology), under which remastered albums were released, published both studio albums on one CD entitled Igra Svetlosti (The Game Of Light). German label Second Harvest remastered and expanded both albums on separate CDs. Igra Staklenih Perli was expanded with live tracks from Soft Explosion Live, while Vrt svetlosti was expanded with the recordings from Inner Flow.

2011 reunion, post reunion
Igra Staklenih Perli reunited in 2011, featuring old members Draško Nikodijević (bass guitar, vocals), Zoran Lakić (keyboards, vocals) and Predrag Vuković (percussion, vocals), and young musicians Ivan Stanković (guitar, vocals) and Sinister Borg (drums). After two concerts in Belgrade club Žica, Draško Nikodijević, Predrag Vuković and Ivan Stanković continued to work under the name Igra Staklenih Perli The Next Generation. In November 2012, Igra Staklenih Perli Next Generation released the studio album Apokaliptus. The album was available for free download through Exit Music. The album, produced by Dušan Kojić "Koja" (of Disciplina Kičme) and recorded by Boris Mladenović (of Jarboli, Veliki Prezir and Sila), featured guest appearances by Dejan Utvar, on drums, Ljubomir Đukić of Električni Orgazam, on keyboards and vocals, and Spomenka Milić, on vocals.

Vojkan Rakić died in Belgrade in 2019. Draško Nikodijević died in Belgrade in 2021.

Discography

Studio albums 
 Igra Staklenih Perli (1979)
 Vrt svetlosti (1980)

Live albums 
 Soft Explosion Live (1991)
 Drives (1993)

Compilation albums 
 Inner Flow (1991)
 Igra svetlosti (2007)

References

External links 
 
 Igra Stalenih Perli at Discogs
 Igra Staklenih Perli at Last.fm
 Igra Staklenih Perli Rateyourmusic
 Igra Staklenih Perli at Prog Archives

Serbian progressive rock groups
Serbian psychedelic rock music groups
Serbian space rock musical groups
Yugoslav rock music groups
Yugoslav progressive rock groups
Yugoslav psychedelic rock music groups
Musical groups from Belgrade
Musical groups established in 1976
Musical groups disestablished in 1985
1976 establishments in Yugoslavia